Kelli Ali, also known as Kelli Dayton (born 30 June 1974), is a British vocalist, who was formerly the lead singer of the trip hop group Sneaker Pimps before going on to a solo career.

Career
Before Sneaker Pimps, Ali was part of a group called Psycho Drama, which she joined when she was 16 years old. A few years later, she was asked by Russell Cross of the band The Lumieres to join his band (as their songwriter, singer, and lead guitarist). The Lumieres only had one major single, "Cinder Hearts".

With Sneaker Pimps she was featured prominently in both the songs and the music videos for the album Becoming X (the group finding fame following the release of the hit single "6 Underground"). Ali was released from the group in 1998 when Chris Corner, the principal songwriter, decided to do vocals for his own songs.

After leaving Sneaker Pimps, she moved on to a solo career under the name Kelli Ali after her father who had passed away before the release of Becoming X. Her first solo album, Tigermouth, was released in 2003. It includes tracks "Sunlight in the Rain" and "Kids" and features ex-Doors drummer John Densmore. She toured alongside Garbage in 2003 and released a follow-up album, Psychic Cat, in mid-2004. The second album was more of a return to Ali's rock and roll roots and featured musician-turned-author Tony O'Neill on keyboards.

In April 2006, she travelled to Japan to record and write tracks with Hoshino Hidehiko from Buck-Tick and Cube Juice for the band Dropz. The same year, producer Paul Oakenfold recorded the Kelli Ali penned song "Faster Kill Pussycat" with actress Brittany Murphy. It is Murphy's only single release.

On 24 November 2008, Ali released Rocking Horse, her third solo album. The album was produced by Max Richter (Fat Cat records) in Glasgow and Edinburgh in the first half of 2008.  In 2009, she self-released the album Butterfly. Ali released her 5th album in 2013, entitled Band of Angels. She has collaborated with the UK band Cult With No Name.

On 2 December 2016, on her Instagram feed Kelli Ali announced a new project, Ghostdriver. In her announcement Ali stated "...it will be a joint album & film project. A noir thriller and love letter to London." The project was being crowd-funded via a PledgeMusic campaign.  On 30 December 2017, Ali posted an update to the site, stating, "Thanks to you, all the filming for Ghostdriver was completed and the edit is in full swing, all songs written and in the later stages of production."

On 24 November 2018, Ali released "The Fear of London" as the lead single from Ghostdriver. It was distributed as a seven-track digital remix single exclusively to fans who contributed to her PledgeMusic campaign. This was followed by an exclusive PledgeMusic-only digital release of the full 15-track Ghostdriver album on 26 January 2019, with an announcement that a full commercial release of the album and single will follow later in 2019 in conjunction with the release of the final film. In the album release announcement, Ali also revealed that her former Sneaker Pimps bandmate and notable producer and engineer Liam Howe contributed extensively to the mix and additional production of the album, notably marking the first collaboration between two original Sneaker Pimps band members since their disbandment.

As post-production work on the film continued through 2019, Ali released a stand-alone single, "Sadistic". It is a collaboration with producer Satoshi Tomiie, recorded during the Ghostdriver sessions. It features additional mix and production from Liam Howe. Released in December 2019 was a limited edition, deluxe Lipstick USB set and a new music video. The Ghostdriver film's post-production suffered delays in 2020 due to the Coronavirus pandemic. The soundtrack album was released 26 November 2020, with the film finally expected around summer 2023 after various post-production delays.

In September 2019, Kelli Ali appeared as a main feature in the Visual Collaborative electronic catalogue, in an issue themed Vivencias which translates to "Experiences" in Spanish. She was interviewed alongside 30 people from around the world such as Dakore Akande, Adelaide Damoah and Desdamona.

In 2021, Ali's song "Rocking Horse" appeared on the soundtrack of the six-part Netflix thriller series Behind Her Eyes.

Discography

Collaborations
 "Long Hard Road Out of Hell" with Marilyn Manson
 "Almost Diamonds" with Marc Almond
 "Faster Kill Pussycat" by Paul Oakenfold and Brittany Murphy (writing credit)
 "Up in Flames" with Satoshi Tomiie
 "Love in Traffic" with Satoshi Tomiie
 "Play With Bootsy" with Bootsy Collins from the album Play With Bootsy
 Remix of "My December" by Linkin Park, featured on the album Reanimation (2002)
 "Still" with Double Six from the album Beyond Sci-fi
 "Payback Time" with The Dysfunctional Psychedelic Waltons single (March 2003)
 "Transient Man" with Millenia Nova from the album Narcotic Wide Screen Vista (2003)
 "A Paradise Inhabited By Devils" with Ozymandias album (2010)
 "Above as Below" with Cult With No Name album (2012)
 "Another Landing" with Cult With No Name album (2014)
 "Heir of the Dog" with Cult With No Name album (2017)
 "Mediaburn" with Cult With No Name album (2019)

Albums
 Tigermouth (One Little Indian Records) (2003)
 Psychic Cat (One Little Indian Records) (2004)
 Sweet Oblivion ( Victor Entertainment,Inc.) (2007) (project with Hoshino Hidehiko of famous Japanese rock band Buck Tick and abstract wonder boy, Cube Juice in Japan. The band of said trio called "DROPZ")
 Rocking Horse (One Little Indian Records) (2008)
 Butterfly (independently released) (2009) (Acoustic reworkings of Rocking Horse album)
 A Paradise Inhabited By Devils (Ozymandias & Kelli Ali) (2010)
 Band of Angels (Independently released) (2013)
 Ghostdriver (Independently released joint album & film project) (Exclusive PledgeMusic release 25 January 2019. Independent commercial release 20 Nov 2021.)

Singles
 2003 "Inferno High Love"
 2003 "Teardrop Hittin' The Ground"
 2003 "Kids"
 2004 "Speakers/Voyeur"
 2004 "Hot Lips"
 2008 "What to Do/One Day at a Time"
 2009 "The Savages/Rocking Horse (Acoustic Version)/Willow's Song"
 2013 "Kiss Me Cleopatra"
 2016 "The Art of Love"
 2017 "The Hunter"
 2019 "The Fear of London"
 2019 "Sadistic"

Filmography
 Ghostdriver (self-directed & -written independent film in which Ali also stars alongside ensemble cast) (Post-Production Due for release in Summer 2023 TBC)

References

External links
  – official site
 
 Kelli Ali on Last FM

1974 births
Living people
Women rock singers
English rock singers
Musicians from Birmingham, West Midlands
One Little Independent Records artists
Freak folk
Ali, Kelli
English women in electronic music
British trip hop musicians
21st-century English women singers
21st-century English singers